The inauguration of Diosdado Macapagal as the ninth president of the Philippines occurred on December 30, 1961. The inauguration marked the beginning of the only four-year term of Diosdado Macapagal as President and of Emmanuel Pelaez as Vice President.

1961 in the Philippines
Presidency of Diosdado Macapagal
Macapagal, Diosdado